Megan Louise Crowson (born 13 June 1996) is field hockey player from England, who plays as a forward.

Personal life
Megan Crowson has a degree in Exercise and Sport Science from the University of Exeter.

Career

Under–18
Crowson debuted for the England U–18 team in 2013 at the EuroHockey Youth Championship in Dublin. At the tournament she captained the side to a bronze medal, scoring four times during the tournament.

In 2014, Crowson also represented the team in test matches against Belgium and Scotland.

Under–21
Following a successful career with the national U–18 team, Megan Crowson progresses into the England U–21 side in 2015. She made four appearances that year, all against Germany U–21.

2016 was Crowson's busiest year with the U–21 team. She represented the team on three occasions; at a four nations tournament in Bad Kreuznach, an invitational tournament in Valencia and at the FIH Junior World Cup in Santiago.

Indoor
In 2018, Crowson was a member of the bronze medal winning England team at the EuroHockey Indoor Championship II in Brussels.

References

External links
 
 

1996 births
Living people
English female field hockey players
Female field hockey forwards